Maxym Pavlenko (born 15 September 1975), is a Ukrainian association football  and futsal player who plays for Interkas Kyiv, MFC Shakhtar Donetsk, Aqtobe-BTA, Time Lviv, Energy Lviv, Uragan Ivano-Frankivsk and the Ukraine national futsal team.

References

External links

1975 births
Living people
Footballers from Kyiv
Ukrainian footballers
FC Dynamo-2 Kyiv players
FC Dynamo-3 Kyiv players
Ukrainian men's futsal players
Interkas Kyiv players
MFC Shakhtar Donetsk players
Time Lviv players
SK Energia Lviv players
Uragan Ivano-Frankivsk players
Ukrainian futsal coaches
Association football midfielders
Ukrainian First League players
Ukrainian Amateur Football Championship players